Woodworth is an unincorporated community and census-designated place in northern Beaver Township, Mahoning County, Ohio, United States. The population was 1,784 at the 2020 census. It is part of the Youngstown-Warren metropolitan area. It lies along State Routes 7 and 626, bordering the communities of Boardman to the north and North Lima to the south.

Demographics

History
Woodworth was originally called Steamtown. A post office called Steamtown was in operation from 1857 until 1860 and a post office called Woodworth from 1874 until 1905.

References

Unincorporated communities in Mahoning County, Ohio
1857 establishments in Ohio
Populated places established in 1857
Unincorporated communities in Ohio